Backstrom is an American crime comedy-drama television series that aired from January 22 through April 30, 2015. It was developed by Hart Hanson based on the Swedish book series by Leif G. W. Persson. The series is set in Portland, Oregon and filmed in Vancouver, British Columbia. On May 8, 2015, Fox cancelled the series after one season.

Premise
Backstrom centers on Everett Backstrom (Rainn Wilson), an "overweight, offensive, irascible" police officer who is engaged in a constant struggle with his "self-destructive" tendencies, and is part of a team of eccentric criminologists.

Cast and characters

Main cast
 Rainn Wilson as Detective Lieutenant Everett Backstrom, head of the Special Crimes Unit. Prior to the beginning of the series Backstrom was demoted to Traffic following his racially insensitive outburst after he caught the murderer of six Native Americans.
 Genevieve Angelson as Detective Sergeant Nicole Gravely, Backstrom's second in command. Gravely is a young, idealistic detective who works with Backstrom even though she finds him to be lazy and cynical.  Originally played by Mamie Gummer in the CBS pilot.
 Page Kennedy as Officer Frank Moto, member of the Special Crimes Unit, and a former MMA fighter.
 Kristoffer Polaha as Sergeant Peter Niedermayer, the unit's Forensics Liaison. Backstrom frequently mocks him for his New Age beliefs.
 Dennis Haysbert as Detective Sergeant John Almond, a nondenominational minister who has been married for 30 years. In an offhand remark, Gravely mentions to Backstrom that Almond has the highest conviction rate out of any detective in the history of the Portland Police Bureau.
 Beatrice Rosen as Nadia Paquet, a foreign-born civilian who supports the detectives in the Special Crimes Group as a cyberspace expert.
 Thomas Dekker as Gregory Valentine, a former male prostitute who is Backstrom's tenant, decorator and "underworld connection" due to his being a fence for stolen merchandise. Backstrom had previously met Valentine's mother, a prostitute. It is later revealed that Valentine is Backstrom's half-brother.

Recurring
 Ben Hollingsworth as  Steve Kines, who previously allowed Gravely to be blamed for a failed undercover operation
 Sarah Chalke as Amy Gazanian, Chair of the Civilian Oversight Committee and Backstrom's ex-fiancée
 Inga Cadranel as Police Chief Anna Cervantes, Backstrom's former (police) partner
 Rizwan Manji as Doctor Deb, a doctor working for the Portland Police Bureau who provisionally clears Backstrom for duty with the caveat that he change his self-destructive lifestyle
 Robert Forster as Sheriff Blue Backstrom, Everett Backstrom's estranged father, who pistol-whipped Everett at a young age. He is Sheriff of Cooch County
 Adam Beach as Tribal Police Captain Jesse Rocha, one of Backstrom's rivals who begins dating Amy Gazanian

Episodes

Production
In July 2012, CBS greenlit a pilot episode to be produced for Backstrom. The pilot for the series was filmed in Vancouver, British Columbia, Canada.

When CBS passed on the pilot, 20th Century Fox Television shopped it around to other networks before landing a 13-episode series order with their own network, Fox. For the pilot episode, the producers contacted Minor League Baseball team Portland Sea Dogs to use their hat with their logo for the family fishing boat business.

Reception
Backstrom has been met with mixed reviews from critics. On Rotten Tomatoes, the show holds a rating of 37%, based on 41 reviews, with an average rating of 4.78/10. The site's critical consensus reads, "Backstroms humor is a cop-out, availed little by the talented cast's attempt to make good of sloppy schtick." On Metacritic, the show has a score of 51 out of 100, based on 31 critics, indicating "Mixed or average reviews".

Other Adaptations
A Swedish language version was created in 2020 and currently has 2 seasons.

References

External links
 
 

2010s American comedy-drama television series
2010s American crime drama television series
2010s American LGBT-related comedy television series
2010s American LGBT-related drama television series
2010s American police comedy television series
2015 American television series debuts
2015 American television series endings
Fictional portrayals of the Portland Police Bureau
Fox Broadcasting Company original programming
Television shows based on Swedish novels
Television series by 20th Century Fox Television
Television shows set in Oregon
Television shows set in Portland, Oregon
Television shows filmed in Vancouver